Lee Young-ho (born 5 July 1992) is a South Korean StarCraft: Brood War and StarCraft II player who played Terran for the Korean pro-gaming team KT Rolster under the alias By.FlaSh or simply Flash. He made his debut as a StarCraft: Brood War player in 2007 and retired on December 19, 2015. Lee began playing StarCraft II competitively in 2011, until his retirement in December 2015. He subsequently returned to playing Starcraft: Brood War, and started his personal broadcast in February 2016 on the AfreecaTV personal broadcasting platform. Since returning to Brood War, Lee has won first place in Seasons 2, 3, 4, and 8 of the Afreeca Starleague. As of 2020, he is still broadcasting personal broadcasts. He is, along with BoxeR, NaDa, Iloveoov, and SAviOr, regarded as the fifth, final, and greatest of the Bonjwas, a title for players who dominated the Korean Brood War scene over long periods of time. He is considered the greatest player of all-time in the Brood War community.

Career

Lee joined KT Rolster in 2007 at the age of 14. He quickly established himself as a top player, carrying KT in the Proleague team competition and achieving fourth place in the 2007 Daum OnGameNet Starleague. The following year, he won the Bacchus OnGameNet Starleague, becoming the youngest player to win a premier Korean tournament - a record still unbroken. His career rose to new heights in the  2009–10 season, when he reached the finals of seven premier tournaments - every one held that season - and won five. Three of those victories were against Lee Jae-dong, a famous rival of Lee Young-ho and the second-best player of the time. These achievements have cemented him as one of the greatest players of all time.

When he first emerged as a professional gamer, Lee received criticism for his use of gimmicky "rush" strategies. However, he soon developed a versatile and well-rounded play style which revolved around strong mechanics, defensive play, and exemplary late-game army control. Choi Yeon-sung has praised Lee's strategic depth, saying that "there aren't many players who set strategic moves, and in the case of [Lee], I think he's looking about 10 games ahead." Lee is famous for coming back in games where he was at seemingly insurmountable disadvantages by playing defensively and exploiting small mistakes in his opponents' play to regain the advantage.

Lee Young-ho set numerous records in StarCraft: Brood War professional competition. He has both the highest career win–loss ratio and highest peak ELO of any player, at 71.74% and 2443 respectively. He has won six OnGameNet Starleague (OSL) and MBCGame StarCraft League (MSL) tournaments (a record shared by only one other player), and won four of those in twelve months (a record unmatched).  He has also won the most games in the Proleague competition and has done so with the highest win-lose ratio of any player.

Lee Young-ho announced his retirement on December 1, 2015. He subsequently returned to playing Starcraft: Brood War, and started his personal broadcast in February 2016 in Afreeca (personal broadcasting platform). Lee would go on to win the Afreeca Season 2 Starleague later that year.

In 2017, Lee competed in the Afreeca Season 3 Starleague and won first place.

In 2017, Lee won the ' Golden Trophy ' for three straight seasons in ASL alone. At the Olympic Stadium in Hanyang University, Seongdong-gu, Seoul on Friday, Lee defeated Cho Il-jang 3:1 in the final match-up of the KT GiGA Internet Afreeca Star League (ASL) season 4. He won the championship three times in a row. Lee won a substantial amount of money by achieving a milestone that he failed to make during his career as a professional gamer. Lee Young-ho hit the 100 million won accumulated in ASL alone.

In 2018, in the finals of the "Olleh TV Afreeca TV Star League (ASL) Season 6", Lee was defeated by Kim Jung-woo (Effort). Kim Jung-woo also won in OSL finals against Lee Young-ho (FlaSh) in 2010, in a famous comeback, by 3:2.

In 2019, Lee skipped the 7th season of ASL due to his arm injury. He took a long break skipping all major tournaments (ASL season7 and all KSL seasons). Fortunately, his arm got better and he competed in the following ASL, Season 8, where he won his 4th ASL against Jang Yoon-chul (Snow) (4-0).

He has played in 9 out of 10 ASL seasons (1, 2, 3, 4, 5, 6, 8, 9 & 10) of which Lee won four times, gained a runner-up once, and placed third twice.

In April 2020, Lee announced that he would switch his race and play future seasons of ASL as Random, rather than as Terran. By selecting Random as his race, Lee will have a one in three chance of playing either Protoss, Zerg, or Terran in any match. He played the remainder of ASL Season 9, as well as the Afreeca StarCraft Team League (ASTL) as Terran. He played his first match as random at the "[T.E.N.] FlaSh Random Match" event. There, he lost to BeSt 2–1, and ZerO 2–1, while defeating Bisu 2–0.

Cryptocurrency scandal
Lee and other prominent gamers and streamers, such as Bisu, were caught up in a cryptocurrency scandal in 2021. Lee was paid by the creator of a new cryptocyrrency T.ocoin, and Lee subsequently publicly talked up investing in that cryptocurrency, without disclosing the payment. It is generally considered unethical to promote a product without disclosing financial ties to the product, as the audience may falsely believe that you are recommending a product purely on objective merits, without any reason for bias. Lee has published a public mea culpa.

See also
 StarCraft: Brood War professional competition

External links
 Flash on Twitch
Flash on Afreecatv

References

South Korean esports players
StarCraft players
KT Rolster players
1992 births
Living people
South Korean Buddhists